Oregon Ballot Measure 60 may refer to:

Oregon Ballot Measure 60 (1998), measure that made Oregon the first state in the United States to conduct its elections exclusively by mail
Oregon Ballot Measure 60 (2008), measure to create a new Oregon state statute mandating that only undefined "classroom performance" would determine teachers' pay raises